Aksana may refer to:
Aksana (given name), a female given name
Aksana (wrestler) (Živilė Raudonienė, born 1982), Lithuanian professional wrestler
Hemaris aksana, a moth of the family Sphingidae.
Kawésqar language, also known as Aksana